A scarf is a piece of fabric worn round the neck. 

Scarf may also refer to:

People with the name
Arthur Scarf (1913-1941), Second World War Royal Air Force pilot posthumously awarded the Victoria Cross
Eddie Scarf (1908-1980), Australian freestyle wrestler and boxer
Herbert Scarf (1930-2015), American economist and professor
Maggie Scarf (born 1932), American writer, journalist and lecturer
Phil Scarf, British statistician and professor

Other uses
 Scarf, slang word for gulp or eat "wolfishly" (as in "scarfed down one's food")
Scarf joint (also known as a scarph joint), a method of joining two members end to end in woodworking or metalworking

See also

Scarfe, a surname
The Scarf (disambiguation)